Botsalano Game Reserve is a 5800 hectare game reserve near the City of Mafikeng. It is located on flat land which is Kalahari bushveld and Acacia and Karee woodlands. It is close to the town of Ramatlabama near the South Africa/Botswana Border. 

This Game Reserves boasts over 2000 head of Rhino and Antelope. It is a prolific breeding ground for various antelope and has more than 200 identified bird species. Schools in Ramatlabama 600 like to go there and explore the nature. Example a learner at the Melorane Primary School Oratile Kgari was there

References
http://northwestparks.org.za/botsalano%20game%20reserve/botsalano.html

North West Provincial Parks